YX may refer to:

 YX Energi, a Scandinavian fuel station chain
 Midwest Airlines (former IATA Code YX)
 Republic Airways (current IATA code YX)
 Yahoo!Xtra, a former New Zealand web portal
 Yx (digraph)

See also 
 XY (disambiguation)